Netstal railway station is a railway station in the municipality of Glarus in the Swiss canton of Glarus. It is an intermediate stop on the Weesen to Linthal railway line, and serves the village of Netstal.

The station is served by Zürich S-Bahn service S25 between Zurich and Linthal, and by St. Gallen S-Bahn service S6 between Rapperswil and Schwanden. Both services operate once per hour, combining to provide two trains per hour between Ziegelbrücke and Schwanden.

Services 
 the following services stop at Netstal:

References

External links 
 
 

Netstal
Netstal